María Dolores Juliano Corregido (1932 – 26 November 2022) was an Argentine cultural and social anthropologist based in Spain.

Biography
María Dolores Juliano was born in Necochea in 1932. She trained as a teacher, studied pedagogy, and earned a licentiate in anthropology at the University of Mar del Plata, graduating in 1975. After the 1976 coup that led to the civic-military dictatorship of Jorge Rafael Videla, she was forced into exile.

Juliano settled in Barcelona, where she completed her doctorate at the University of Barcelona (UB) with the thesis Integración y marginación en la cultura rural catalana. Análisis de endoculturación (Integration and Marginalization in Catalan Rural Culture: Endoculturation Analysis). In 1977 she became a professor of anthropology at UB's Faculty of Geography and History, ​​a position she held until her retirement in 2001.

Juliano published numerous studies on the anthropology of education, migratory movements, ethnic minorities, gender studies, and social exclusion. Her scientific output has always been accompanied by a relevant social and feminist commitment.

In 2002, she appeared before the Spanish Senate's Commission on Prostitution as a contributor to the drafting of its final report.

In 2010, she was awarded the Creu de Sant Jordi for her academic career and valuable research results.

In 2021, she received the LASA/Oxfam America Martin Diskin Memorial Lectureship for her activism on behalf of marginalized sectors of society.

Selected publications
 
 
 
 
 
 
 
 
 
 
 
  Novel.

References

External links
 María Dolores Juliano Corregido at Dialnet 
  

1932 births
2022 deaths
Argentine expatriates in Spain
Argentine feminists
Argentine women anthropologists
Cultural anthropologists
People from Buenos Aires Province
Social anthropologists
Academic staff of the University of Barcelona
Date of birth missing